The men's C-2 500 metres event was an open-style, pairs canoeing event conducted as part of the Canoeing at the 1996 Summer Olympics program.

Medalists

Results

Heats
19 teams entered in three heats. The top three finishers from each of the heats advanced to the semifinals while the remaining teams were relegated to the repechages.

Repechages
Two repechages were held. The top four finishers from each repechage and the fastest fifth-place finisher advanced to the semifinals.

Semifinals
Two semifinals were held. The top four finishers from each semifinal and the fastest fifth-place finisher advanced to the final.

Final
The final was held on August 4.

Juravschi, in his third Summer Olympics with his third different country, convinced his old partner Reneysky, who he won gold with in this event at the 1988 Summer Olympics, in 1994 to compete with him. The pair lost to the gold-medal winning Hungarians in a photo-finish by less than two centimeters (0.75 inches). Prior to that Reneysky was a coach for Belarus

References
1996 Summer Olympics official report Volume 3. pp. 172–3. 
Sports-reference.com 1996 C-2 500 m results.
Wallechinsky, David and Jaime Loucky (2008). "Canoeing: Men's Canadian Doubles 500 Meters". In The Complete Book of the Olympics: 2008 Edition. London: Aurum Press Limited. p. 482.

Men's C-2 500
Men's events at the 1996 Summer Olympics